The following is a timeline of the history of the city of Kraków, Poland.

Prior to 16th century

 1000 - Catholic diocese of Kraków established.
 1038 - Capital of Poland relocated from Gniezno/Poznań to Kraków.
 1044 - Benedictine Abbey  established in Tyniec near Kraków.
 1079 - Capital of Poland relocated from Kraków to Płock.
 1138
 Capital of Poland relocated from Płock back to Kraków.
 Kraków becomes the capital of the newly formed Seniorate Province.
 1142 - Cathedral built (approximate date).
 1241 - Kraków sacked by Mongol forces during the first Mongol invasion of Poland.
 1290 - Town captured by Wenceslaus II of Bohemia.
 1306 - Kraków taken by Władysław Łokietek.
 1313 - Kraków Town Hall built (approximate date).
 1315 - 27 June: Polish-Danish-Norwegian-Swedish alliance concluded in Kraków.
 1320
 20 January: Coronation of Władysław I Łokietek as King of Poland in the Wawel Cathedral, as the first Polish king to be crowned in Kraków.
 Kraków becomes the official coronation site for the kings of Poland.
 1333
 Burial of Władysław I Łokietek in the Wawel Cathedral as the first Polish king to be buried there.
 Wawel Cathedral becomes the official burial site for the kings of Poland.
 1364
 12 May: Cracow Academy founded.
 22–27 September: Congress of Kraków.
 Wawel Cathedral and Collegium Maius built.
 1384 - 16 October: Royal coronation of Queen Jadwiga of Poland in the Wawel Cathedral.
 1386
 15 February: Baptism of Władysław II Jagiełło in the Wawel Cathedral.
 18 February: Royal wedding of Władysław II Jagiełło and Jadwiga of Poland.
 4 March: Royal coronation of Władysław II Jagiełło in the Wawel Cathedral.
 1390 - Public clock installed (approximate date).
 1395 - Kraków Cloth Hall built.
 1397 - St. Mary's Basilica built.
 1399 - Burial of Queen Jadwiga of Poland and Princess Elizabeth Bonifacia in the Wawel Cathedral.
 1407 - Synagogue built in Kazimierz.
 1417 - Royal coronation of Elizabeth Granowska as Queen consort of Poland in the Wawel Cathedral.
 1420 - Bellmakers guild established.
 1443 - Earthquake, which caused damage to the Saint Catherine Church.
 1491
 Paper mill established in Prądnik Czerwony.
 Printing press in operation.

16th to 18th centuries
 1521 - Sigismund Bell installed in tower of Wawel Cathedral.
 1525
 8 April: Treaty of Kraków signed.
 10 April: Prussian Homage.
 1558 - Establishment of a permanent postal connection between Kraków and Venice; foundation of Poczta Polska.
 1566 -  built (near St. Florian's Gate).

 1587 - Kraków besieged by Maximilian III, Archduke of Austria.
 1609 - Polish capital relocated from Kraków to Warsaw by Sigismund III Vasa (approximate date).
 1610 - Bagel first mentioned.
 1618 - Church of St. Adalbert rebuilt.
 1619 - Saints Peter and Paul Church built.
 1655 - Siege of Kraków (1655) by Swedish forces.

 1661 - Merkuriusz Polski Ordynaryjny newspaper begins publication.
 1702 - Swedish invasion of Poland (1701–1706): City taken by forces of Charles XII of Sweden.
 1703 - Church of St. Anne rebuilt.
 1768
 City taken by Russian forces.
 St. Florian's Church rebuilt.
 1781 - Theatre opens.
 1783 - Botanic Garden of the Jagiellonian University founded.

 1794
 24 March: Kościuszko's proclamation against Russian rule occurs in Main Square.
 June: Prussians in power.
 1795 - City annexed by Austria in the Third Partition of Poland.

19th century
 1809 - City becomes part of the Duchy of Warsaw.
 1810 - Population: 23,612.
 1815 - Republic of Krakow established per Congress of Vienna.
 1820 - Most of Kraków Town Hall demolished (except tower).
 1823 - Kościuszko Mound completed.
 1831 - City occupied by Russian forces.
 1846
 February: Kraków Uprising against Austrian forces;  established.
 November: City becomes part of Austria again; Grand Duchy of Cracow established.
 1847 - Kraków Główny railway station built.
 1848 -  newspaper begins publication.

 1850
 18 February: Archaeological Museum of Kraków established.
 18 July: Kraków fire of 1850.
 1851 - Population: 41,086.
 1869 - July: Imprisonment of nun  discovered; unrest ensues.
 1873 - School of Fine Arts and Academy of Learning active.
 1879 - National Museum, Kraków established.
 1883 - The first ever liquefaction of oxygen and nitrogen performed by Zygmunt Wróblewski and Karol Olszewski in Kraków.
 1885 - Park Krakowski established.
 1890 - Population: 76,025.
 1893 - Municipal Theatre opens.
 1898 - Mickiewicz monument installed in Main Square.
 1900
 Nicolaus Copernicus Monument unveiled.
 Population: 91,310.

20th century

1900–1939

 1904 - Emeryk Hutten-Czapski Museum opened.
 1905 - Zielony Balonik literary cabaret begins in Jama Michalika on Floriańska Street.
 1906 - Cracovia and Wisła Kraków football clubs founded.
 1909 - Kraków Philharmonic Orchestra founded.
 1910
 15 July: Grunwald Monument unveiled.
 Population: 151,781.
 1916 -  (cinema) opens.
 1917 - Formiści (art group) formed.
 1918 - City becomes part of reborn Poland.
 1919 - Wawel Kraków football club founded.
 1920 - Population: 176,463.
 1921
 Garbarnia Kraków football club founded.
 Cracovia wins its first Polish football championship.
 1923 - Cracovia ice hockey team founded.
 1927 - Wisła Kraków wins its first Polish football championship.
 1929
 Kraków Zoo opens.
 Cracovia wins its first Polish men's basketball championship.
 Cracovia wins its first Polish women's basketball championship.
 1930 - Wawel Castle museum established.
 1931
 Kraków Philharmonic hall opens.
 Garbarnia Kraków wins its first Polish football championship.
 Population: 219,300.
 1933
  (art group) formed.
 Cracovia wins its first Polish men's volleyball championship.
 1937 - Cracovia wins its first Polish ice hockey championship.

World War II (1939–1945)

 1939
 6 September: German forces enter city.
 12 September: The Einsatzgruppe zbV entered the city.
 12 September: Execution of 10 Jews by the Germans.
 September: Dulag transit camp for Polish prisoners of war established by the Germans.
 September: Organizacja Orła Białego underground Polish resistance organization founded.
 4 November: City becomes seat of Nazi German General Government of occupied Poland.
 6 November: 183 Polish professors and lecturers arrested by the Germans during Sonderaktion Krakau.
 9–10 November: Mass arrests of 120 Poles, incl. teachers, students and judges, during the Intelligenzaktion.
 December: Dulag camp dissolved.
 1939–1940 - Massacres of over 1,700 Poles at Fort 49 of the Kraków Fortress and the adjacent forest.
 1940 - 30 March: Mass arrests of Poles during the AB-Aktion.
 1941 - March: Kraków Ghetto of Jews established by occupying Germans.
 1942
 Local branch of the Żegota underground Polish resistance organization established to rescue Jews from the Holocaust.
 5 June:  prisoner-of-war camp for Dutch, Belgian and French POWs established by the Germans.
 October: Kraków-Płaszów concentration camp established by the Germans.
 1943 - March: Liquidation of the Kraków Ghetto.
 1944
 6 August: Stalag 369 camp dissolved.
 Deportations of Poles by the occupiers from the Dulag 121 camp in Pruszków to Kraków during and following the Warsaw Uprising.
 1945
 January: Kraków-Płaszów concentration camp evacuated by the occupiers and dissolved.
 January: Russians take city; German occupation ends.

1945–2000
 1945 – Historical Museum of Kraków established.
 1946 - Krakow Polytechnic established.
 1949
 Gazeta Krakowska newspaper begins publication.
 Development of Nowa Huta area begins.
 1950
  founded.
 Population: 347,500.

 1951 - Polish Academy of Sciences' Division of Medicinal Plants established.
 1954
 Lenin Steelworks begins operating.
 Opera Krakowska founded.
 Wisła Kraków wins its first Polish men's basketball championship.
 1955
 Cricot 2 theatre group formed.
 Population: 428,231.
 1956
 28 October: Start of mass blood donation for the Hungarian Revolution of 1956 (see also Hungary–Poland relations).
 Raising of funds, food and medical supplies for the Hungarians.
 30 October, 5 November: Protests against the Soviet suppression of the Hungarian Revolution.
 1959
 Krzysztofory Gallery and Kino Mikro (cinema). open.
 Wawel Kraków wins its first Polish women's basketball championship.
 Wisła Kraków wins its first Polish women's volleyball championship.
 1961 - Kraków Film Festival begins.
 1963 - Wisła Kraków wins its first Polish women's basketball championship.
 1964
 Balice Airport begins operating.
 Polish Aviation Museum established.
 Karol Wojtyła becomes Catholic archbishop.
 1965 – Population: 520,145.
 1967 -  (cinema) opens.
 1973 - Tyniec becomes part of Kraków.
 1974 - Population: 662,900.

 1978
 May: Kraków co-hosts the 1978 UEFA European Under-18 Championship.
 Kraków Old Town designated an UNESCO World Heritage Site.
 1979 - Hutnik Kraków wins its first Polish handball championship.
 1988
 Hutnik Kraków wins its first Polish men's volleyball championship.
 Jewish Culture Festival in Kraków begins.
 1990 -  newspaper begins publication.
 1993 - Institute for Strategic Studies established.
 1997 - Cracow Klezmer Band formed.
 1998 - Andrzej Maria Gołaś becomes mayor.
 1999 - City becomes part of the Lesser Poland Voivodeship.
 2000 - City designated a European Capital of Culture.

21st century
 2001 - Honorary Consulate of Norway opened.
 2002 - Jacek Majchrowski becomes mayor.
 2004
 17 April: First khachkar in Poland unveiled.
 7 May: First Kraków Equality March.
 2006 - Galeria Krakowska shopping mall in business.
 2008
 Kraków Fast Tram begins operating.
 International Festival of Independent Cinema Off Plus Camera begins.
 2009
  (cinema) opens.
 Sister city relationship established with San Francisco, USA.

 2010
 1 February: Museum of Contemporary Art in Kraków opened.
 18 April: State funeral of Lech and Maria Kaczyński.
 10 June: Oskar Schindler's Enamel Factory museum opened.
 30 September:  opened.
 2012 - Population: 758,300.
 2013 - Air pollution in Krakow reaches annual mean of 37 PM2.5 and 51 PM10, more than recommended.
 2014
 May: Tauron Arena opens.
 May: Kraków referendum, 2014 held; Kraków bid for the 2022 Winter Olympics withdrawn.
 2016 - July: Kraków hosts the World Youth Day 2016.
 2017
 June: Kraków co-hosts the 2017 UEFA European Under-21 Championship.
 August–September: Kraków co-hosts the 2017 Men's European Volleyball Championship.
 2021 - Honorary Consulate of Peru opened.

See also
 History of Kraków
 Other names of Kraków, e.g. Krakau
 List of mayors of Kraków
 List of churches of Kraków
 Synagogues of Kraków
 List of events in Kraków (currently ongoing)
 List of Polish monarchs, some crowned in Kraków

References

This article incorporates information from the Polish Wikipedia and German Wikipedia.

Bibliography

Published in 18th-19th centuries
 
 
 
 
 
 
 
 
 
 

Published in 20th century
 
 
 
 
 
 
 
 K.Z. Sowa (1984). "The development of Kraków in the nineteenth century against the background of the historic role of the city." (in) B. Hamm and B. Jaowiecki (eds.), Urbanism and human values. Bonn: BFLR, pp. 101–128.
 
 

Published in 21st century

External links

 
Krakow
krakow
Years in Poland